Chan Yung-jan was the defending champion, but decided not to compete that year.

Tamarine Tanasugarn won the title, defeating Kimiko Date-Krumm 4–6, 7–5, 6–2 in the final.

Seeds

Draw

Finals

Top half

Bottom half

References
 Results

Kangaroo Cup - Singles
2008 Singles
2008 in Japanese tennis